Global Explorer ROV is a unique deep water remotely operated vehicle that has made numerous dives below  on science and survey expeditions for National Geographic, the National Oceanographic and Atmospheric Administration (NOAA) and other research organizations. It was designed and built by Chris Nicholson of Deep Sea Systems International, Inc. of Falmouth, Massachusetts.

Expeditions

2001 Loch Ness Science Survey 

Dr. Robert Rines organized an expedition to search for the Loch Ness Monster using the Global Explorer ROV to obtain underwater images. The search did not find the Monster but did photograph an image on the bottom that looked like a large dead animal.

2002 Arctic Ocean 

On the NOAA's Arctic Exploration 2002, Global Explorer ROV dove to the bottom of the Canada Basin and collected live specimens down through the water column. The ROV also obtained digital still photographs and video of sea life. This was the first ever census of marine life throughout the entire water column from the surface of the ice to the seafloor.

2003 Loch Ness Science Survey 

Dr. Robert Rines worked to find the Loch Ness Monster on a second expedition with the Global Explorer ROV. This mission also ended without any success finding the Monster.

2005 Arctic Ocean 

Global Explorer ROV was the key tool used on the NOAA's Hidden Ocean Arctic 2005 expedition. Live specimens were obtained down to 9,000 feet and high definition video and still images.

2007 USS Grunion 

In August, 2007, Global Explorer ROV was instrumental in locating the submarine , which, with 70 men on board, disappeared during World War II and had been listed by the US Navy as "missing in action, cause unknown". The expedition to locate the submarine was financed and arranged by the family of the commander of USS Grunion, Lieutenant Commander Mannert L. Abele.

2007 Celebes Sea 

In September and October 2007, Global Explorer ROV joined NOAA and National Geographic on an expedition to the unexplored depths of the Celebes Sea, south of the Philippine Islands. The ROV was equipped with a high definition (HD) color video camera, a digital still camera, a 12-chambered suction sampler, and static canister samplers.

The Global Explorer ROV was the star of the expedition. In strong currents, it collected live specimens as well as photographs and video of unusual and unfamiliar specimens.

Notes

References 

 
 
 
 
 

Robotic submarines
Remotely operated underwater vehicles